Weightlifting at the 1972 Summer Paralympics consisted of six events for men.

Participating nations 
There were 46 male competitors representing 18 nations.

Medal summary

Medal table 
There were 18 medal winners representing 10 nations.

Men's events

References 

 

1972 Summer Paralympics events
1972
Paralympics